The 1986 All-Ireland Junior Hurling Championship was the 56th staging of the All-Ireland Junior Championship, the Gaelic Athletic Association's second tier Gaelic football championship.

Galway were the defending champions, however, they surrendered their title when the Connacht Junior Championship was suspended.

The All-Ireland final was played on 19 October 1986 at the Emerald GAA Grounds in Ruislip, between London and Cork, in what was their first meeting in the final in 20 years. London won the match by 1–09 to 0–07 to claim their sixth championship title overall and a first title in 15 years.

Results

All-Ireland Junior Football Championship

All-Ireland semi-final

All-Ireland home final

All-Ireland final

References

Junior
All-Ireland Junior Football Championship